The 1st Royal Bavarian Chevau-légers "Emperor Nicholas of Russia" (Königlich Bayerisches Chevaulegers-Regiment „Kaiser Nikolaus von Rußland“ Nr. 1) was a light cavalry regiment of the Royal Bavarian Army. The regiment was formed in 1682 and fought in the Battle of Vienna, the Great Turkish War, the War of the Spanish Succession, the War of the Austrian Succession, the Napoleonic Wars, the Austro-Prussian War, the Franco-Prussian War, and World War I. The regiment was disbanded in 1919.

See also
List of Imperial German cavalry regiments

References

Cavalry regiments of the Bavarian Army
Regiments of the German Army in World War I
Military units and formations established in 1682
Military units and formations disestablished in 1919
1682 establishments in the Holy Roman Empire
17th-century establishments in Bavaria
1919 disestablishments in Germany